Alice McLerran (born Alice van Kleek Enderton; 1933–2019) was an American anthropologist and author.

Biography
Alice van Kleek Enderton was born in West Point, New York, on June 24, 1933.  Her father, Herbert Enderton, was a Colonel in the U.S. Army.  In 1950, the family lived in Quito, Ecuador, where Enderton served as military attaché to the U.S. embassy. While there, McLerran befriended art dealer Luce de Peron and her later husband, painter Oswaldo Guayasamín.

McLerran enrolled at Stanford University in 1951. In 1953, she married Henry Anderson, with whom she had three children: Stephen, David, and Rachel.

In 1961, she enrolled at the University of California, Berkeley, where she finished her undergraduate studies and entered the PhD. program in anthropology. Her advisor was Prof. John Rowe. McLerran's thesis project sought to establish a chronology of pre-Columbian civilizations in the northern highlands of Ecuador. To do this, in 1968–1969 she returned to Ecuador and excavated a number of graves in Carchi Province, recovering and reassembling the pottery, analyzing the pottery styles, and using radiocarbon dating to establish their age.

After finishing her PhD. in 1969, McLerran taught anthropology for three years at the State University of New York, Cortland. In 1973, she moved to Boston where she studied at the Harvard School of Public Health, receiving M.P.H and M.S. degrees in 1974. She worked with Lester Grinspoon on research in psychiatric epidemiology at Massachusetts Mental Hospital.

In 1976, she married Larry McLerran, then a physicist postdoc at MIT, whose subsequent career took them to at a number of physics research labs and departments:  SLAC, University of Washington, Fermilab, University of Minnesota, Brookhaven National Laboratory, and University of Washington again.

During these travels, McLerran began writing children's books.  Her first book, The Mountain that Loved a Bird, was published in 1985. The first edition was illustrated by Eric Carle.  It was later published in 24 languages, and with other illustrators. Roxaboxen, illustrated by Barbara Cooney, was published in 1991. It tells the true story of a hill in Yuma, Arizona, where McLerran's mother and her friends created a play town in 1915. As a result of the book, the area was made into a city park in 2000, and an annual Roxaboxen Festival was celebrated.

McLerran died on November 17, 2019 in Seattle.

Works
 "An Archeological Sequence from Carchi, Ecuador". Alice Enderton Francisco. UC Berkeley Dissertations Publishing, 1969. 552 pages.
 The Mountain that Loved a Bird (Picture Book Studio, 1985)
 Secrets (Lothrop, 1990)
 Roxaboxen (Puffin Books, 1991)
 I Want to Go Home (Tambourine Press, 1992)
 Dreamsong (Tambourine Press, 1992)
 Hugs (Cartwheel Press, 1993)
 Kisses (Cartwheel Press, 1993)
 Ghost Dance (Clarion, 1995)
 The Year of the Ranch (Viking Kestrel Picture Books, 1996)
 The Legacy of Roxaboxen (Absey & Co., 1998)
 Dragonfly (Absey & Co., 2000)

References

External links
 Official website
 Obituary, The New York Times, November 24, 2019.

1933 births
2019 deaths
American anthropologists
People from West Point, New York
Writers from New York (state)
Stanford University alumni
University of California, Berkeley alumni
State University of New York at Cortland faculty
Harvard School of Public Health alumni